William Edgar Thomason (1872 — April 13, 1938) was a Texas politician that served in the Texas House of Representatives and the Texas Senate. Thomason was affiliated with the Democratic Party.

Personal life
William Edgar Thomason was born in 1872, and died on April 13, 1938. He is buried at Oak Grove Cemetery in Nacogdoches, Texas. Thomason resided in Nacogdoches, Texas throughout his life.

Political career
Thomason was sworn in on January 9, 1917 to represent district 7 of the Texas House of Representatives succeeding A. Russel. At the time, district 3 was composed of Nacogdoches County, Texas. He continued to represent House District 7 until he left off on January 9, 1923 being succeeded by William Scott Crawford. On January 8, 1929, Thomason was sworn into represent district 3 of the Texas Senate succeeding I.D. Fairchild. The district was composed of Angelina County, Cherokee County, Jasper County, Nacogdoches County, Newton County, Sabine County, San Augustine County, and Tyler County. During part of the 42nd Texas legislature, Thomason served as Texas Senate president pro tempore. He exited office on January 10, 1933 being succeeded by John S. Redditt. Throughout his tenure, Thomason was affiliated with the Democratic Party.

References

1873 births
1938 deaths
20th-century American politicians
Texas House of Representatives
People from Nacogdoches, Texas
Texas state senators